Trévor Clévenot (born 28 June 1994) is a French professional volleyball player. He is a member of the France national team, a gold medallist at the Olympic Games Tokyo 2020 and a two–time World League winner (2015, 2017). At the professional club level, he plays for Jastrzębski Węgiel.

Personal life
He is a son of the former French volleyball player – Alain Clévenot.

Honours

Clubs
 National championships
 2021/2022  Polish SuperCup, with Jastrzębski Węgiel 
 2021/2022  Polish Championship, with Jastrzębski Węgiel
 2022/2023  Polish SuperCup, with Jastrzębski Węgiel

Youth national team
 2011  CEV U19 European Championship

Individual awards
 2015: French Championship – Best Receiver
 2022: FIVB Nations League – Best Outside Spiker

State awards
 2021:  Knight of the Legion of Honour

References

External links

 
 Player profile at LegaVolley.it 
 Player profile at PlusLiga.pl  
 
 
 Player profile at Volleybox.net

1994 births
Living people
People from Royan
Sportspeople from Charente-Maritime
French men's volleyball players
European Games competitors for France
Volleyball players at the 2015 European Games
Olympic volleyball players of France
Volleyball players at the 2016 Summer Olympics
Volleyball players at the 2020 Summer Olympics
Medalists at the 2020 Summer Olympics
Olympic gold medalists for France
Olympic medalists in volleyball
Mediterranean Games medalists in volleyball
Mediterranean Games bronze medalists for France
Competitors at the 2013 Mediterranean Games
French expatriate sportspeople in Italy
Expatriate volleyball players in Italy
French expatriate sportspeople in Poland
Expatriate volleyball players in Poland
Jastrzębski Węgiel players
Outside hitters